Anita Burroughs is an American politician serving as a member of the New Hampshire House of Representatives from the Carroll 1st district.

Career
On November 6, 2018, Burroughs was elected to the New Hampshire House of Representatives where she represents the Carroll 1 district. She defeated the sitting Speaker of the House, Gene Chandler. Burroughs assumed office on December 5, 2018. Burroughs is a Democrat.

Personal life
Burroughs resides in Glen, New Hampshire. Burroughs is married to Jonathan and has two step-children and one grandchild.

References

Living people
Women state legislators in New Hampshire
Democratic Party members of the New Hampshire House of Representatives
21st-century American women politicians
21st-century American politicians
Year of birth missing (living people)